Hymn of the Nations, originally titled Arturo Toscanini: Hymn of the Nations, is a 1944 film directed by Alexander Hammid, which features the Inno delle nazioni, a patriotic work for tenor soloist, chorus, and orchestra, composed by Italian opera composer Giuseppe Verdi in the early-1860s. For this musical work, Verdi utilized the national anthems of several European nations.

Production
In December 1943, Arturo Toscanini filmed a performance of this music for inclusion in an Office of War Information documentary about the role of Italian-Americans in aiding the Allies during World War II. Toscanini added a bridge passage to include arrangements of  "The Star-Spangled Banner" for the United States and "The Internationale" for the Soviet Union and the Italian partisans. Joining Toscanini in the filmed performance in NBC Studio 8-H, were tenor Jan Peerce, the Westminster Choir, and the NBC Symphony Orchestra.

The film also included the overture to Verdi's opera La Forza del Destino. The narration was written by May Sarton, film editing by Boris Kaufman, and narration read by actor Burgess Meredith. The original version was released on VHS by Blackhawk Films, which retitled it Arturo Toscanini Conducts Giuseppe Verdi. A newly restored version by the Library of Congress, with the Meredith narration, has been issued on DVD.

Reception
The film was nominated for an Academy Award for Best Documentary Short. The Academy Film Archive preserved Hymn of the Nations in 2010. The film is part of the Academy War Film Collection, one of the largest collections of World War II era short films held outside government archives.

Censorship
During the post-war Red Scare, the US government crudely censored "The Internationale" out of the film. The version continued to be released without any acknowledgement of censorship. The uncensored version was thought to have been lost until a print was rediscovered in Alaska.

References

External links

 
 Hymn of the Nations at the National Archives and Records Administration
 

1944 films
1940s Italian-language films
American short documentary films
Films directed by Alexandr Hackenschmied
1944 short films
American black-and-white films
1944 documentary films
1940s short documentary films
1940s English-language films
Italian-language American films
1940s American films